Frimley and Camberley was an urban district in Surrey, England from 1894 to 1974.

Area
Frimley and Camberley consisted of the villages of Frimley, Mytchett, Frimley Green, nascent town of Camberley and the 20th century military community of Frimley, Deepcut.  Under the Local Government Act 1972 it merged with Bagshot Rural District to form Surrey Heath district on 1 April 1974. The council offices were on the London Road in Camberley. The building was converted into residential properties in the 1980s when new offices were built for Surrey Heath Borough Council.

History
Consisting of the civil parish of Frimley, the district was called Frimley Urban District until 1929 when it was renamed Frimley and Camberley. Frimley had been in existence for many years and was a Registration Sub-District of the Farnham Registration district which was created in 1846. The name Camberley was devised by Royal Mail in 1877 when it was decided to avoid postal confusion to rename the growing town of Cambridge Town, technically a locality of Frimley  named after the Duke of Cambridge who established a military Staff College in the area in 1862.

Motto
The motto for the district was 'A Deo Et Regina' (From God and the Queen).

References

External links
Surrey Heath Borough Council

Districts of England created by the Local Government Act 1894
Districts of England abolished by the Local Government Act 1972
History of Surrey
Urban districts of England